Nonda is a stratovolcano on the island of Vella Lavella.

References 

Stratovolcanoes of the Solomon Islands
Pleistocene stratovolcanoes